"Suddenly Strange" is a song by New Zealand recording artist, Bic Runga. The song was released in September 1997 as the third single from her debut studio album Drive.

Track listing (New Zealand)
 New Zealand CD single (Columbia – 664940.2)
 "Suddenly Strange"
 "All Fall Down"
 "Welcome to My Kitchen"

 Australian CD single (Columbia – 666689.2)
 "Suddenly Strange" - 4:20
 "Welcome To My Kitchen"	- 4:02
 "Ordinary Girl" - 2:40

Weekly charts

References

External links
Bic's official website

1997 singles
Bic Runga songs
1997 songs
Columbia Records singles
Songs written by Bic Runga